
Nolet Het Reymerswale is a defunct restaurant in Yerseke in the Netherlands. It was a fine dining restaurant that was awarded one Michelin star in 1976 and retained that rating until 2010. 

First head chef to earn the Michelin star, in 1976, was father Theo Nolet. From around 1993 son Danny Nolet was in command. The restaurant closed down in October 2010, a victim of the economic recession.

See also
List of Michelin starred restaurants in the Netherlands

References 

Restaurants in the Netherlands
Michelin Guide starred restaurants in the Netherlands
Defunct restaurants in the Netherlands
Restaurants in Zeeland
Buildings and structures in Reimerswaal